The Jiguopai Old Church is a church in Sanmin Village, Fuxing District, Taoyuan City, Taiwan.

History
The church was built by Huang Rong-quan, a Presbyterian Church priest in Taiwan, in 1964 with a group of Atayal people. It underwent reconstruction after 2000 after its roof collapsed and damaged the building. In 2004, the building was designated as a historical spot by the Taoyuan County Government. In 2013, the church was selected as one of the 100 Religious Attractions in Taiwan by the Ministry of the Interior.

Architecture
The church roof is supported by woods with round door at the entrance with Chinese style.

See also
 List of tourist attractions in Taiwan
 Christianity in Taiwan

References

Churches in Taiwan
Buildings and structures in Taoyuan City
Tourist attractions in Taoyuan City
1964 establishments in Taiwan